Tudo Bem (English: Everything's Alright) is a 1978 Brazilian drama film directed by Arnaldo Jabor. It stars Paulo Gracindo and Fernanda Montenegro.

Cast 
 Paulo Gracindo – Juarez Ramos Barata
 Fernanda Montenegro – Elvira Barata
 Regina Casé – Vera Lúcia
 Luiz Fernando Guimarães – Zé Roberto
 Zezé Motta – Zezé
 Paulo César Pereio – Bill Thompson
 Fernando Torres – Giacometti
 Luiz Linhares – Pedro Penteado
 Jorge Loredo – Juarez's friend
 Daniel Dantas – José Roberto's friend
 Maria Sílvia – Aparecida de Fátima
 José Dumont – Piauí
 Stênio Garcia – Zeca Maluco
 Anselmo Vasconcelos – Worker
 Guilherme Karan

Accolades
1978: Festival de Brasília
Best Film (won)
Best Supporting Actor (Paulo César Peréio) (won)

1980: Taormina International Film Festival
Golden Charybdis (Nominee)
Best Actress (Fernanda Montenegro) (won)

References

External links 
 

1978 films
1970s Portuguese-language films
Brazilian drama films
Films directed by Arnaldo Jabor
1978 drama films